Headquartered in California, California First National Bancorp is a registered financial holding company for California First National Bank and California First Leasing Corp. The company currently operates with two primary businesses including an FDIC-insured national bank and a leading leasing company specializing in financing high-technology capital assets.  The company offers various leasing and banking services including leasing and financing capital assets, leasing non-high technology property, accepting various deposit products and various commercial loans for corporations, companies, educational institute and other social organizations.

References

External links

Companies listed on the Nasdaq
Banks established in 1977
Banks based in California
Financial services companies of the United States
Holding companies of the United States
Holding companies established in 1977
1977 establishments in California
American companies established in 1977